Cemeteries in Belgium both civil and military.

Civil cemeteries
 Arlon Cemetery
 Brussels Cemetery (also large military section)
 Campo Santo (Sint Amandsberg near Gent)
 Ixelles Cemetery
 Laeken Cemetery
 Molenbeek-Saint-Jean Cemetery
 Saint-Josse-ten-Noode Cemetery
 Schaerbeek Cemetery
 Schoonselhof Cemetery (also large military section)

Belgian military 
 De Panne war cemetery
 Adinkerke war cemetery
 Keiem war cemetery
 Houthulst war cemetery
 Ramskapelle war cemetery 
 Steenkerke war cemetery
 Westvleteren war cemetery
 Leopoldsburg war cemetery
 Fort de Loncin
 Champion war cemetery 
 Belgrade war cemetery
 Veltem war cemetery
 Hoogstade war cemetery
 Oeren war cemetery
 Bruges war cemetery

German military  
 Hooglede German war cemetery
 Langemark German war cemetery
 Lommel German war cemetery
 Menen German war cemetery
 Recogne German war cemetery
 Vladslo German war cemetery

US military 
 Ardennes American Cemetery and Memorial
 Flanders Field American Cemetery and Memorial
 Henri-Chapelle American Cemetery and Memorial

French military  
 Cimetière d'Anloy-Bruyères
 Cimetière de la Belle-Motte
 Cimetière de l'Orée de la Forêt
 Cimetière Virton Bellevue
 Chastre French war cemetery 
 Dinant (Citadelle) French war cemetery
 Maissin War Cemetery (Luxemburg Province)
 Ossuaire Kemmelberg
 Saint-Charles de Potyze

British (Commonwealth) military 
 Artillery Wood Commonwealth War Graves Commission Cemetery
 Bedford House Commonwealth War Graves Commission Cemetery
 Berks Commonwealth War Graves Commission Cemetery Extension
 Blauwepoort Farm Commonwealth War Graves Commission Cemetery
 Brandhoek Military Commonwealth War Graves Commission Cemetery
 Brandhoek New Military Commonwealth War Graves Commission Cemetery
 Brandhoek New Military Number 3 Commonwealth War Graves Commission Cemetery
 Buffs Road Commonwealth War Graves Commission Cemetery
 Buttes New British Cemetery (New Zealand) Memorial
 Chester Farm Commonwealth War Graves Commission Cemetery
 Dickebusch New Military Commonwealth War Graves Commission Cemetery and Extension
 Dickebusch Old Military Commonwealth War Graves Commission Cemetery
 Divisional Collecting Post Commonwealth War Graves Commission Cemetery and Extension
 Divisional Commonwealth War Graves Commission Cemetery
 Duhallow ADS Commonwealth War Graves Commission Cemetery
 Elzenwalle Brasserie Commonwealth War Graves Commission Cemetery
 Essex Farm Commonwealth War Graves Commission Cemetery
 First DCLI Commonwealth War Graves Commission Cemetery, The Bluff
 Hedge Row Trench Commonwealth War Graves Commission Cemetery
 Hooge Crater Commonwealth War Graves Commission Cemetery
 La Belle Alliance Commonwealth War Graves Commission Cemetery
 La Brique Military Commonwealth War Graves Commission Cemeteries
 Larch Wood (Railway Cutting) Commonwealth War Graves Commission Cemetery
 Lone Tree Commonwealth War Graves Commission Cemetery
 Menin Road South Military Commonwealth War Graves Commission Cemetery
 Mud Corner Commonwealth War Graves Commission Cemetery
 New Irish Farm Commonwealth War Graves Commission Cemetery
 Oxford Road Commonwealth War Graves Commission Cemetery
 Perth (China Wall) Commonwealth War Graves Commission Cemetery
 Potijze Burial Ground Commonwealth War Graves Commission Cemetery
 Potijze Château Lawn and Grounds Commonwealth War Graves Commission Cemeteries
 Potijze Château Wood Commonwealth War Graves Commission Cemetery
 Railway Chateau Commonwealth War Graves Commission Cemetery
 Ramparts (Lille Gate) Commonwealth War Graves Commission Cemetery
 Ramscappelle Road Military Cemetery
 RE Grave Railway Wood Commonwealth War Graves Commission Cemetery
 Ridge Wood Military Commonwealth War Graves Commission Cemetery
 St Symphorien Military Cemetery
 Sanctuary Wood Commonwealth War Graves Commission Cemetery
 Spanbroekmolen British Commonwealth War Graves Commission Cemetery
 Spoilbank Commonwealth War Graves Commission Cemetery
 Suffolk Commonwealth War Graves Commission Cemetery
 Track "X" Commonwealth War Graves Commission Cemetery
 Tuileries British Commonwealth War Graves Commission Cemetery
 Tyne Cot
 Voormezeele Enclosures Commonwealth War Graves Commission Cemeteries
 White House Commonwealth War Graves Commission Cemetery
 Wieltje Farm Commonwealth War Graves Commission Cemetery
 Woods Commonwealth War Graves Commission Cemetery
 Ypres Reservoir Commonwealth War Graves Commission Cemetery
 Ypres Town Commonwealth War Graves Commission Cemetery and Extension

Belgium
 
Cemeteries